Yunji (also Romanized as Yūnjī; also known as Yonji and Yūbjī) is a village in Haram Rud-e Olya Rural District, in the Central District of Malayer County, Hamadan Province, Iran. At the 2006 census, its population was 128, in 29 families.

References 

Populated places in Malayer County